HHQ may refer to:

 HHQ, the IATA code for Hua Hin Airport, Prachuap Khiri Khan Province, Thailand
 HHQ, the Pinyin code for Huanghejingqu railway station, Zhengzhou, Henan, China